Leonard Drożdżewicz (born 14 August 1960) is a Polish notary, columnist, publisher and social activist.

Biography 

In June 1986, he started his notary's office in his hometown Sokółka, in Podlaskie Voivodeship in northeastern Poland. Between 1999–2004, he was the secretary of the Council of the Notary Science Center Foundation (Polish: Fundacja Centrum Naukowe Notariatu), established by the National Council of Notaries in order to support and conduct scientific and research works in the field of law, also in Warsaw. Until mid-2012, he was a member of the Foundation's Council.

He has published several dozen articles in the field of civil, economic, notary and foundation law in legal journals, including the monthly  and Nowy Przegląd Notarialny. Since 2013, he has been a regular collaborator of the literary and cultural quarterly , published in Vilnius. Together with his wife, Helena Drożdżewicz, he published two booklets in Polish: Sokólski Brueghel – Witalis Sarosiek (1945–2012; 2013) and Antologia Doliny Łosośny: jak pieśń żurawia nad wiekowymi wiązami (2019). He also published a chapter in the book Historia, tradycja, pamięć: prace ofiarowane Profesorowi Józefowi Maroszkowi w siedemdziesiątą rocznicę urodzin (2020).

Since 2016, together with his cousin Wiktoria Tołłoczko-Tur, he has been organizing an annual international open-air painting workshop In the Valley of Lasosna in Puciłki on the Lasosna (Polish: W dolinie Łosośny; the first pilot plein-air took place in 2014), which takes place in the summer house of Leonard and Helena Drożdżewicz. Leonard Drożdżewicz inherited this house with farm buildings, land and a pond nearby from his parents, and then renovated it as a pre-war summer resort.

Awards 
 Silver Cross of Merit “for activities for the Polish community in Lithuania, cultivating the common historical and cultural heritage” (2017).

References 

Living people
1960 births
Polish notaries
University of Warsaw alumni
Recipients of the Silver Cross of Merit (Poland)
21st-century Polish journalists
Polish columnists